Fintan Meyler, born Gertrude Anne Meyler (December 14, 1929, in Ireland - July 23, 2005) was an actress on stage, on television, and in films.
Meyler was one of seven children.

Her early education came at a convent in Dublin, before she began studying acting at the Gate Theatre in Dublin. She was chosen Miss Ireland in 1950, which led to her coming to the United States.  Meyler never left.  Eventually, she made her way to California.  Her first TV role was on Matinee Theater.  Under the name Fintan Meyler, she starred in over 30 different TV shows.  She portrayed memorable characters in shows, such as The Donna Reed Show, Perry Mason, Bonanza, The Rebel, Have Gun - Will Travel and Gunsmoke. In the 1959 Perry Mason episode "The Case of the Howling Dog", she played three-time murderer Thelma Brent.

She died of cancer in San Jose, California.

Filmography

References

External links
 

Irish emigrants to the United States
Irish stage actresses
Irish television actresses
1929 births
2005 deaths